Nationality words link to articles with information on the nation's poetry or literature (for instance, Irish or France).

Events
 April 4 – William Wordsworth accepts the office of Poet Laureate of the United Kingdom (following the death of Robert Southey on March 21) on being assured that it is regarded as a purely honorific position.

Works published

United Kingdom
 R. S. Hawker, Reeds Shaken with the Wind
 Thomas Hood, "The Song of the Shirt", a poem (published in the Christmas issue of Punch)
 Richard Henry Horne, Orion: An epic poem

United States
 William Ellery Channing (poet), Poems, published at the expense of the author's friend Samuel Gray Ward; the volume is admired by Ralph Waldo Emerson and Henry David Thoreau but condemned by Edgar Allan Poe in "Our Amateur Poets", an essay in Graham's
 Thomas Dunn English, "Ben Bolt", a popular ballad written for the New York Mirror and later set to music numerous times
 William Lloyd Garrison, Sonnets
 James Russell Lowell, Miscellaneous Poems
 Cornelius Mathews, Poems on Man in His Various Aspects under the American Republic
 William Gilmore Simms, Donna Florida, a verse tale; Charleston
 James Gates Percival, The Dream of a Day
 John Pierpont, The Anti-Slavery Poems of John Pierpont
 Elizabeth Oakes Smith, The Sinless Child and Other Poems, acclaimed by critics, including Edgar Allan Poe
 John Greenleaf Whittier, Lays of My Home and Other Poems, regional poetry, including "The Merrimack", "The Funeral Tree of the Sokokis", "The Ballad of Cassandra Southwick" and "Massachusetts to Virginia"
 Nathaniel Parker Willis:
 The Sacred Poems
 Poems of Passion
 The Lady Jane and Other Poems

Other
 Hilario Ascasubi, El gaucho Jacinto Cielo con doce números, Argentina
 Marceline Desbordes-Valmore, Bouquets et prières, France
 Christian Winther, Til Een ("To Someone"); see also revised edition 1849; Denmark
 Gonçalves Dias, "Canção do exílio", Brazil
 Mikhail Lermontov, "Valerik", Russia, posthumously in the anthology Dawn
 Betty Paoli, Nach dem Gewitter ("After the Storm"), Austria

Births
Death years link to the corresponding "[year] in poetry" article:
 February 24 – Violet Fane, pen name of Lady Mary Currie, née Mary Montgomerie Lamb (died 1905), English novelist, poet and essayist
 May 3 – Edward Dowden (died 1913), Irish-born poet and critic
 August 19 – Charles Montagu Doughty (died 1926), English poet, writer and traveller
 December 7 – Helena Nyblom, née Roed (died 1926), Danish-born poet and writer of fairy tales
 December 21 – Thomas Bracken (died 1898), Irish-born New Zealander
 December 24 (December 12 O.S.) – Lydia Koidula, born Lydia Jannsen (died 1886), Estonian
 Undated – Dimitrios Paparrigopoulos (died 1873), Greek

Deaths

Death years link to the corresponding "[year] in poetry" article:
 January 11 – Francis Scott Key (born 1779), American lawyer, author, and amateur poet who wrote the words to the United States' national anthem, "The Star-Spangled Banner"
 March 21 – Robert Southey (born 1774), English Poet Laureate
 June 6 – Friedrich Hölderlin (born 1770), German lyric poet
 July 9 – Washington Allston, 63 (born 1779), American poet and painter
 December 11 - Casimir Delavigne (born 1793), French poet and dramatist

See also
 19th century in poetry
 19th century in literature
 List of years in poetry
 List of years in literature
 Victorian literature
 French literature of the 19th century

 Biedermeier era of German literature
 Golden Age of Russian Poetry (1800–1850)
 Young Germany (Junges Deutschland) a loose group of German writers from about 1830 to 1850
 List of poets
 Poetry
 List of poetry awards

Notes

19th-century poetry

Poetry